Hong Kong competed at the 2004 Summer Paralympics in Athens, Greece. The team included 24 athletes, 15 men and 9 women. Competitors from Hong Kong won 19 medals, including 11 gold, 7 silver and 1 bronze to finish 17th in the medal table.

Medallists

Sports

Athletics

Men's track

Women's track

Boccia

Individual events

Pairs/team events

Shooting

Table tennis

Men

Kwong Kam Shing was disqualified for excessive use of prohibited solvents on his rackets. Christophe Durand was awarded the bronze medal for France.

Women

Wheelchair fencing

Men

Women

Teams

See also
Hong Kong at the Paralympics
Hong Kong at the 2004 Summer Olympics

References 

Nations at the 2004 Summer Paralympics
2004
Summer Paralympics